Kinathukadavu block is a revenue block of Coimbatore district of the Indian state of Tamil Nadu. This revenue block consist of 34 panchayat villages.

List of Panchayat Villages 

They are,

Villages
Muthukkavuntanore

References 

Revenue blocks of Coimbatore district